The name Longwang was used fore two tropical cyclones in the northwestern Pacific Ocean. The name was submitted by China and literally means "Dragon King".

 Tropical Storm Longwang (2000) (T0002, 02W, Biring) – developed over the northern Philippines and moved northwestward over the open ocean. 
 Typhoon Longwang (2005) (T0519, 19W, Maring) – a deadly Category 4 typhoon that made landfall on Taiwan and then in Fujian Province, China.

The name "Longwang" was retired after the 2005 season, and replaced with "Haikui".

Pacific typhoon set index articles